In the 2014–15 season, CS Constantine competed in the Ligue 1 for the 17th season, as well as the Algerian Cup.

Squad list
Players and squad numbers last updated on 18 November 2014.Note: Flags indicate national team as has been defined under FIFA eligibility rules. Players may hold more than one non-FIFA nationality.

Pre-season and friendlies

Competitions

Overview

Ligue 1

The Ligue 1 2014-2015 is the fifty-first edition of Algerian Ligue Professionnelle 1 and the fifth under the name Ligue 1. Division opposes sixteen clubs in a series of thirty meetings. The best in the league qualify for the African cups that are the Champions League (the podium) and Confederation Cup (the third and the winner national cup).

The relegated the previous season, JSM Bejaia on CA Bordj Bou Arreridj and CRB Ain Fakroun are replaced by USM Bel-Abbès, Ligue 2 in 2013-2014 after a year's absence, the ASM Oran, 7 years after his last appearance at the highest national level, and NA Hussein Dey relegated to Ligue 2 during the 2010–2011 season.

League table

Results summary

Results by round

Matches

Algerian Cup

Squad information

Playing statistics

|-
! colspan=10 style=background:#dcdcdc; text-align:center| Goalkeepers

|-
! colspan=10 style=background:#dcdcdc; text-align:center| Defenders

|-
! colspan=10 style=background:#dcdcdc; text-align:center| Midfielders

|-
! colspan=10 style=background:#dcdcdc; text-align:center| Forwards

|-
! colspan=10 style=background:#dcdcdc; text-align:center| Players transferred out during the season

Goalscorers
Includes all competitive matches. The list is sorted alphabetically by surname when total goals are equal.

Transfers

In

Out

References

CS Constantine seasons
Algerian football clubs 2014–15 season